Karimovo (Kärim) is a rural locality (a village) in Ilchigulovsky Selsoviet, Uchalinsky District, Bashkortostan, Russia. The population was 270 as of 2010. There are 5 streets.

Geography 
Karimovo is located 56 km northeast of Uchaly (the district's administrative centre) by road. Altyntash is the nearest rural locality.

References 

Rural localities in Uchalinsky District